Abu al-Futuh al-Razi, full name Abū al-Futūḥ al-Ḥusayn ibn ʿAlī ibn Muḥammad ibn Aḥmad al-Khuzāʿī al-Rāzī al-Nīsābūrī or Abu al-Futuh Jamal al-Din al-Razi al-Nisaburi, also known as Khaza'i Nishaburi (fl. 6th A.H./12th century), was a Shiʿite theologian and author. He came from an Arab family originally from Nishapur and supposedly from the Khuza'a tribe, which settled in Nishapur. His grandfather had moved to Rayy, where he taught and later died in or after 1131 CE. 

His most famous work, Rawz al-jinan wa Ruh al-Janan, is considered the first Persian-language exegesis on the Quran. The book, consisting of twenty volumes, is the earliest surviving Persian tafsīr with an Imāmī Shīʿī emphasis. It delves into mystical themes regularly.

References

Quranic exegesis scholars
1131 deaths
People from Ray, Iran
12th-century Persian-language writers
12th-century Arabs
Iranian Shia scholars of Islam